Poltergeist is a steel roller coaster located at Six Flags Fiesta Texas in San Antonio, Texas. Designed by Werner Stengel and manufactured by Premier Rides, the roller coaster opened to the public on May 28, 1999. Its track was fabricated by Dynamic Structures and Intermountain Lift, Inc.

History

On October 8, 1998, Six Flags Fiesta Texas announced a $30 million expansion on new rides. There would be three major rides set to open that year, which were Poltergeist, Boomerang and Scream. Poltergeist would be built by Premier Rides and be an LIM launch coaster. The ride would replace Seaside Golf, a miniature golf course that opened with the park in 1992.

Poltergeist officially opened on May 28, 1999.

The attraction closed temporarily in 2021 for refurbishment, which included a new color scheme, upgraded queue line, and repainted station. The track was repainted a light green, while the supports were repainted a darker green-gray. New elements were added to the queue, such as an archway, refreshed railings, garage scenery, a hedge maze, an expanded indoor queue area, planters and other themed structures. Moreover, a ghostly statue was added on top of the station. The trains were also repainted. Poltergeist reopened on September 3, 2021.

Ride Layout
Poltergeist is located in the Rockville section of the park.

After boarding Poltergeist, riders are launched through a narrow launch tunnel into a "spaghetti bowl" of track which contains a cobra roll, a sidewinder, and many twists and turns. This coaster doesn't have a mid-course brake run like Flight of Fear has at Kings Island and Kings Dominion, or rings like Joker's Jinx at Six Flags America. After that riders spiral downward and to the left and after more twists and turns they pass through a corkscrew before arriving at the ride's final brake run.

Premier Rides built several of these LIM Catapult roller coasters from 1996 to 1999, although, of those, only the two Flight of Fear rides are indoors. The other outdoor LIM Catapult coaster in the United States is Joker's Jinx at Six Flags America; that opened in 1999. In addition, a LIM Catapult coaster called Mad Cobra operated at Suzuka Circuit in Japan from 1998 to 2003; Mad Cobra was moved to China and reopened at Kingdoms of Discovery in 2006. The five Premier LIM catapult coasters share a similar layout and have the same technical specifications.

Poltergeist uses a LIM launching system instead of a traditional lift hill to propel riders into its first inversions. Initially, the ride had over-the-shoulder restraints, but due to numerous reports of pain and discomfort, these were replaced in 2002 with more traditional individual ratcheting lapbars.

Ride Elements
Cobra Roll
Sidewinder
Corkscrew

Similar rides
Poltergeist opened in the same year as The Joker's Jinx at Six Flags America (1999), three years after the world's first LIM-launched coasters, Flight of Fear, opened at Kings Island (1996) and Kings Dominion (1996).

In other media
Poltergeist is also featured in Barnes & Noble's Roller Coasters: A Thrill Seeker's Guide to the Ultimate Scream Machines.

References

External links 
Official Poltergeist website

Roller coasters operated by Six Flags
Roller coasters manufactured by Dynamic Structures
Steel roller coasters
Roller coasters in Texas
Six Flags Fiesta Texas
Roller coasters introduced in 1999
1999 establishments in Texas